Hovnanian (Armenian: Հովնանյան, Western Armenian Յովնանեան) is an Armenian surname.

It may refer to:

People:
Jirair Hovnanian (1927 - August 14, 2007) - founder of J.S. Hovnanian & Sons home builders
Kevork Hovnanian (1923-2009) - founder of Hovnanian Enterprises

Companies:
Hovnanian Enterprises - a public construction corporation founded by Kevork Hovnanian

Armenian-language surnames